Lionel Francis Garnett (1895-1983), was a Fijian lawn bowls international who competed in the 1950 British Empire Games.

Bowls career
At the 1950 British Empire Games he won the bronze medal in the singles event.

References

Fijian male bowls players
1895 births
1983 deaths
Bowls players at the 1950 British Empire Games
Commonwealth Games bronze medallists for Fiji
Commonwealth Games medallists in lawn bowls
Medallists at the 1950 British Empire Games